Stephen James Wheeler (born 16 October 1986) is an English cricketer.  Wheeler is a right-handed batsman who bowls right-arm fast-medium.  He was born in Frimley, Surrey.

While studying for his degree at Loughborough University, Wheeler made his first-class debut for Loughborough UCCE against Somerset in 2007.  He made a further two first-class appearances for the team in 2007, against Worcestershire and Yorkshire.  In his three first-class matches, he scored 33 runs at an average of 8.25, with a high score of 13.  With the ball, he took a single wicket, which came at an overall cost of 312 runs. Wheeler consequently has a first-class bowling average of 312.00, which is the worst by an Englishman and third-worst of all time – only two Indian players, Krishna Kumar (375.00) and Ashok Malhotra (347.00), have higher first-class averages.

Wheeler later made his debut for Berkshire in the 2010 MCCA Knockout Trophy against Norfolk.  To date he has made six appearances each in the Minor Counties Championship and MCCA Knockout Trophy.

References

External links
Stephen Wheeler at ESPNcricinfo
Stephen Wheeler at CricketArchive

1986 births
Living people
Cricketers from Frimley
Alumni of Loughborough University
English cricketers
Loughborough MCCU cricketers
Berkshire cricketers